Șcheia is a commune located in Suceava County, Bukovina, northeastern Romania. It is composed of five villages: namely Florinta, Mihoveni, Sfântu Ilie, Șcheia, and Trei Movile.

Politics and administration 

The commune's current local council has the following multi-party political composition, based on the results of the ballots cast at the 2020 Romanian local elections:

Natives 

 Neculai Nichitean, former rugby union football player
 Vasile Tarnavschi, theologian

Gallery

References 

Communes in Suceava County
Localities in Southern Bukovina
Duchy of Bukovina